A bullet is a projectile propelled by a firearm, sling, or air gun.

Bullet may also refer to:

Arts and entertainment

Films and television
 Bullet (1976 film), an Indian Hindi language film directed by Vijay Anand
 Bullet (1984 film), an Indian Malayalam language film directed by Crossbelt Mani
 Bullet (1985 film), an Indian Telugu language film directed by Bapu
 Bullet (1996 film), an American film starring Mickey Rourke and Tupac Shakur
 Bullet (1999 film), a Philippine film directed by and starring Cesar Montano
 Bullet (2008 film), a Malayalam language film directed by Nizar
 Bullet (2014 film), an American action film starring Danny Trejo
 Bullets (Finnish  TV series), a 2018 Finnish action drama television series starring Sibel Kekilli
 Bullets (Indian   TV series), 2021

Music 
 Bullet Records, several record labels
 Bullet (American band), known for "White Lies, Blue Eyes"
 Bullet (Swedish band), a heavy metal band
 Bullet for My Valentine, a Welsh metalcore band whose name is frequently shortened to "Bullet"
 Bullet, an English hard rock band, renamed to Hard Stuff in 1972
 Bullett (Mat Kearney album), 2004
 "Bullet" (Christian Burns song), 2012
 "Bullets" (Creed song), 2002
 "Bullets" (Editors song), 2005
 "Bullet" (Fluke song), 1995
 "Bullet" (Franz Ferdinand song), 2013
 "Bullet" (Hollywood Undead song), 2011
 "Bullet" (Misfits song), 1978
 "Bullet" (Superheist song), 2001
 "Bullet", a song by Covenant from Northern Light, 2002
 "Bullet", a song by Infinite Mass, 2001
 "Bullet", a song by The Rasmus from Into, 2001
 "Bullet", a song by The Reverend Horton Heat from Smoke 'Em If You Got 'Em, 1990
 Fender Bullet and Squier Bullet, electric guitars

Comics 
 Bullet (DC Thomson), a British comic published during the 1970s
 Bullet (Marvel Comics), a Marvel Comics character

Other 
 Bullet (novel), the nineteenth book in the Anita Blake: Vampire Hunter series by Laurell K. Hamilton

People 
 Bullet (nickname)
 Bullet (surname)
 Bob Armstrong (born 1939), known as Bullet, professional wrestler
 Bullet, a fictional character from the BlazBlue series

Sports 
 Baltimore Bullets (disambiguation), three basketball franchises from the 1940s to the 1970s
 Birmingham Bullets, a British Basketball League team from 1982 to 2006
 Brisbane Bullets, a professional team in Australia's National Basketball League
 Camden Bullets, a 1960s American basketball team, originally the Baltimore Bullets
 Pigotts Bullets F.C., an Antigua and Barbuda Football Association team
 Texas Bullets, a Professional Indoor Football League in 1998
 Washington Wizards, formerly known as "The Bullets", a National Basketball Association team
 Bullet (mascot), the mascot of the sports teams at Oklahoma State University-Stillwater
 Bullet chess, a variant of blitz (high-speed) chess

Technology
 Bullet (pressure vessel), a bullet-shaped storage container for gas
 Bullet (software), an open source physics engine
 Wave Mate Bullet, an early microcomputer
 bullet connector, a type of electrical connector

Transport
 Bullet 14, an American sailboat design

Automotive
 Buckeye Bullet, an electric land speed vehicle designed and created by students at Ohio State University
 Bullet (car), car prototype was built in 1996 using a Mazda MX-5 body
 Sterling Bullet, a pickup truck marketed between 2007 and 2009
 Royal Enfield Bullet, a motorcycle in production since 1948

Aviation
 Bristol Bullet, a British biplane racing aircraft
 Brokaw Bullet, a two-seater sports airplane
 Bullet Monoplane, an American monoplane first flown in 1929
 Christmas Bullet, an American biplane fighter
 Guggenmos Bullet, a series of German hang gliders
 TrikeBuggy Bullet, an American powered parachute design

Rail
 Bullet train (disambiguation), an aerodynamically-designed fast rail vehicle
 Bullet (interurban), a high-speed U.S. interurban rail car inaugurated in 1931
 Bathurst Bullet, a passenger train connecting Sydney and Bathurst, Australia
 Bullet TCV, a troop-carrying vehicle developed by Rhodesia
 Caribou (train), a passenger train formerly used in Newfoundland and colloquially referred to as The Newfie Bullet or The Bullet
 Bullet, a former passenger train of the Central Railroad of New Jersey

Other uses
 Bullet (typography) (•), a solid typographic symbol
 Bullet, Switzerland, a municipality
 "Bullet", another name for the adult toy love egg
 "Bullet", a dog belonging to the singer and actor Roy Rogers
 Jake Bullet, a character in the 1989 action movie No Holds Barred
 The Bullet (UMW), the student newspaper of the University of Mary Washington

See also
 Fender Bullet Bass, an electric bass guitar model produced by Fender
 Bullet Club, professional wrestling stable in the New Japan Pro Wrestling promotion
 Bullet loan, a noncallable regular coupon paying debt instrument
 Bullet Cluster, two colliding clusters of galaxies
 Bullet Galaxy
 Bullet Group, a newly merging group of galaxies
 Bullit (disambiguation)
 Bullitt (disambiguation)